For the 1996 Vuelta a España, the field consisted of 180 riders; 115 finished the race.

By rider

By nationality

References

1996 Vuelta a España
1996